This article aims at providing details on the participation and performance of Atlético Petróleos de Luanda at the various competitions organized by the Confederation of African Football, namely the CAF Champions League, the CAF Confederation Cup and the former CAF Cup and CAF Winner's Cup as well as international tournaments and friendlies.

Petro de Luanda has a total 29 participations in CAF-sponsored competitions, including 8 in the CAF Champions League, 9 in the African Cup of Champions Clubs, 7 in the CAF Confederation Cup, 4 in the CAF Cup Winners' Cup and 1 in the CAF Cup.

In 1997, the club reached the final of the CAF Cup, having finished as the runner-up. In 2001, they reached the semi-finals of the CAF Champions League. In 2004 and 2006, they reached the group stage of the CAF Confederation cup and in 2019-20, that of the Champions League.

Overall positions

2021–22 Champions League

2020–21 Champions League

2019–20 Champions League

2018–19 Confederation Cup

2018 Confederation Cup

2015 Confederation Cup

2014 Confederation Cup

2013 Confederation Cup

2010 Confederation Cup

2010 Champions League

2009 Champions League

2008 Confederation Cup

2007 Champions League

2006 Confederation Cup

2004 Confederation Cup

2004 Champions League

2003 Cup Winners' Cup

2002 Champions League

2001 Champions League

1999 Cup Winners' Cup

1998 Champions League

1997 CAF Cup

Final

Second Leg

Second Leg

1996 Cup of Champions Clubs

1995 Cup of Champions Clubs

1994 Cup of Champions Clubs

1993 Cup Winners' Cup

1992 Cup Winners' Cup

1991 Cup of Champions Clubs

1990 Cup of Champions Clubs

1989 Cup of Champions Clubs

1988 Cup of Champions Clubs

1987 Cup of Champions Clubs

1985 Cup of Champions Clubs

1983 Cup of Champions Clubs

Friendlies
In 1987, a four-team tournament marking the 10th anniversary of Angolan state-owned oil company Sonangol, the official sponsor of Petro de Luanda, was held in Luanda with the participation of FC Porto, S.L. Benfica and Vasco da Gama. Petro won the tournament by beating F.C. Porto 2-0 and beating Benfica on penalties after a scoreless draw at the end of regular time.

On the occasion of the 2nd Congress of the ruling party, the MPLA, Sporting da Praia from Cape Verde was invited to play a series of matches in Angola.

In February 1985, Fluminense was invited to play friendly games in Luanda and Huambo against Petro and Mambroa, to mark the 24th anniversary of the beginning of the armed struggle by the MPLA guerrilla against colonialism.

External links
 Referees

References

Angolan football clubs in international competitions